Herman Doerner (22 November 1914 – 27 December 1976) was an Australian water polo player. He competed in the men's tournament at the 1948 Summer Olympics. He also won the gold medal with the Australian team in the exhibition event at the 1950 British Empire Games.

References

External links
 

1914 births
1976 deaths
Australian male water polo players
Olympic water polo players of Australia
Water polo players at the 1948 Summer Olympics
Commonwealth Games gold medallists for Australia
Water polo players at the 1950 British Empire Games
Sportsmen from New South Wales